KBTF may refer to:

 Skypark Airport (ICAO code KBTF)
 KBTF-CD, a low-power television station (channel 31) licensed to serve Bakersfield, California, United States